Saint Oliva (or Olivia) (†138) was martyred under Hadrian; her relics are venerated at Saint Afra's Church, Brescia. Her feast day is 5 March.

External links
Icon of St Olivia
Oliva at Patron Saints Index
5 March saints at SaintPatrickDC.org

Italian saints
Year of birth missing
138 deaths
2nd-century Christian saints
Ante-Nicene Christian female saints
2nd-century women